WFAX (1220 AM) is a Regional Mexican and Reggaeton formatted broadcast radio station licensed to Falls Church, Virginia, serving Metro Washington, D.C. WFAX is owned and operated by Jose Villafañe's Costa Media, through licensee Costa Media Boston LLC.

On June 8, 2022, WFAX had announced that it would change its format from religious talk to Regional Mexican/Spanish Rhythmic branded as "La Pantera" on July 1.

Translator
WFAX has one FM translator, on 100.7, co-located with its AM transmitter. The signal is almost entirely directed to the southwest to protect WZBA on the same frequency.

References

External links

1948 establishments in Virginia
Spanish-language radio stations in the United States
Regional Mexican radio stations in the United States
Radio stations established in 1948
FAX
Falls Church, Virginia
Reggaeton radio stations